Kunoi Vithichai (November 6, 1933 – January 3, 2008) was a former professional boxer from Thailand. He fought in the flyweight division in the 1950s–'60s.

Biography and career
Kunoi was born in Bangkok's Yaowarat neighborhood, his parents are Overseas Chinese immigrants living in Thailand. He had the birth name in Chinese "Aeayuh Sae-heng" (เอี้ยหยู แซ่เฮ้ง).

He fights in the names "Kimyuh Vithichai" (กิมหยู วิถีชัย) and "Kunoi Vithichai" under Vithichai Boxing Gym by Chit Ampongsin as a trainer. He started with Muay Thai by fighting regularly at Rajadamnern Stadium and changed into professional at a later time.

He has been fighting with Pone Kingpetch, a first world champion of Thailand, three times in 1956. At first, he was the winner by TKO (Pone's brows broken since the fifth round can't continue to fight) in the seventh round and won the Rajadamnern Stadium flyweight champion (comparable to Thailand champion). Second, he was defeated by knocked out in the sixth round at the ground in front of Lumpinee Park, and the last he was defeated by points decision over the 10 rounds lost the Rajadamnern Stadium flyweight champion.

Later, he had three unsuccessful attempts at the Oriental and Pacific Boxing Federation flyweight title. And he also had twice boxes in the special bout against Chartchai Chionoi before his retired in 1962.

Kunoi is a fighter boxer with aggressive fighting style, many times he has to fight even though with less weight than his opponent.

After Pone became a world champion, he had been interviewed. His best opponents are not Pascual Pérez, not Fighting Harada, but he is Kunoi Vithichai.

Retirement and death
After retirement, he worked as a taxi driver for a while. Later, he worked as a driver for the Daily News newspaper and Charoen Pokphand Company (CP). For the boxing circles he was a trainer for three Thai boxers who later became world champions viz Saensak Muangsurin, Napa Kiatwanchai and Muangchai Kittikasem.

He has four children, three sons and one daughter. His daughter, Busaba "TaNgaew" Mahattapong, was a famous and very popular Channel V Thailand's VJ in the 90s.

Kunoi died on January 3, 2008, with Alzheimer's disease that lasted more than four years, tote 74 years old, his official record to 8–10–0 (6KOs). But from his personal record to 77–14–4.

Title and honour
Rajadamnern Stadium Flyweight Champion (112 lbs) (1956)
Victory Jacket from Sports Authority of Thailand (SAT)

References

External links
 

Deaths from Alzheimer's disease
1933 births
2008 deaths
Kunoi Vithichai
Boxing trainers
Kunoi Vithichai
Flyweight boxers
Kunoi Vithichai
Kunoi Vithichai
Kunoi Vithichai
Deaths from dementia in Thailand